Cancer/testis antigen 83 is a protein that in humans is encoded by the CT83 gene.

References

Further reading 

Human proteins